Virginia's 94th House of Delegates district elects one of the 100 members of the Virginia House of Delegates, the lower house of the state's bicameral legislature. The district is made up of part of Newport News, Virginia.

The district has been represented by Democrat Shelly Simonds since 2020. In 2017, an extremely close race in this district made national headlines. Following a three-judge panel decision declaring the race a tie, the winner of the 2017 general election was determined by lot with David Yancey winning.

Recent election results

2017 tie
The district's election in 2017 was unusually close. Shelly Simonds challenged Yancey for the second time. Unofficial election night results showed Yancey with a 12-vote lead. The race had statewide significance because if Yancey were to win, Republicans would hold a majority in the House of Delegates, but if Simonds were to win, the parties would each have 50 seats, which would have required a power-sharing agreement in the chamber. On November 20, the Virginia State Board of Elections certified Yancey as the winner by 10 votes. Simonds requested a recount. The recount gave Simonds the win by a single vote. Following this, a three-judge panel decided that a potential overvote ballot should be counted for Yancey, thus tying the race. The potential overvote ballot shows a vote for both Simonds and Yancey with Simonds' crossed out, but also shows the vote for the governor crossed out. The winner was set to be decided based on drawing a name out of a bowl on December 27. Appeals by Simonds' campaign postponed the drawing until January 4, 2018. At that time, David Yancey's name was drawn by lot and he was declared the winner. The loser of such a drawing maintains the right to ask for another recount. On January 10, 2018, Simonds declared that she would not seek a second recount and that she was conceding the race to Yancey.

List of delegates

References

Virginia House of Delegates districts
Newport News, Virginia